The Lost Caracoles Dam, or Caracoles Dam is a concrete-face rock-fill dam on the San Juan River about  west of San Juan in San Juan Province, Argentina. The purpose of the dam is to provide water for irrigation and the generation of hydroelectric power. Construction began in 2004 and the dam and power station were completed in 2009.

See also

References

Dams completed in 2009
Energy infrastructure completed in 2009
Dams in Argentina
Concrete-face rock-fill dams
Buildings and structures in San Juan Province, Argentina
Hydroelectric power stations in Argentina